Magdalena is a 1955 Mexican drama film directed by Joaquín Pardavé and starring Rosario Granados, Fernando Fernández and Rodolfo Landa.

Cast
 Rosario Granados as Magdalena Antúnez  
 Fernando Fernández as Luis  
 Rodolfo Landa as Ernesto  
 Martha Valdés as Lucila  
 Anita Blanch as Tía Concha  
 Arturo Soto Rangel as Maestro de música  
 Tito Novaro as Eduardo  
 Elsa Cárdenas as Elenita 
 Roberto G. Rivera as Rodrigo  
 Ernesto Finance as Lic. Arturo Aguilar 
 José Pidal as Doctor 
 León Barroso as Doctor II  
 Aurora Zermeño as Enriqueta, assistante de Magdalena

References

Bibliography 
 Emilio García Riera. Historia documental del cine mexicano: 1953-1954. Universidad de Guadalajara, 1997.

External links 
 

1955 films
1955 drama films
Mexican drama films
1950s Spanish-language films
Films directed by Joaquín Pardavé
Mexican black-and-white films
1950s Mexican films